Karrar Mohammed (born 6 March 1989) is an Iraqi footballer who last played as a centre back for Al-Minaa in the Iraq Premier League, as well as the Iraq national team.

International career
On 24 July 2016, Karrar made his first international cap with Iraq against Uzbekistan in a friendly match.

Honours

Club
Al-Zawraa
 Iraqi Premier League: 2015–16
Iraq FA Cup: 2016–17
Al-Shorta
 Iraqi Premier League: 2018–19

References

External links 
 

1989 births
Living people
Sportspeople from Basra
Association football defenders
Iraqi footballers
Iraq international footballers
Al-Bahri players
Naft Al-Basra SC players
Najaf FC players
Al-Zawraa SC players
Al-Shorta SC players
Amanat Baghdad players
Al-Mina'a SC players